CKSS-FM is an FM radio station in Stony Plain, Alberta, Canada. Owned by Blackgold Broadcasting, it broadcasts a country format branded as 88.1 The One.

Programming team consists of Katie Stanners on One Mornings, Justin Hartman on the Drive Home and Shane Michaels on One Evenings.

History 
On September 15, 2014, beating a competing proposal by Golden West Broadcasting, the CRTC approved an application by Blackgold Broadcasting for a new FM radio station to serve Parkland County, which would serve as the first radio station to specifically target the region. The station planned to broadcast a country music format branded as 88.1 The One; in regards to local content, Blackgold stated in its application that it planned to broadcast 81 hours of spoken-word content per week, including news, agricultural reports, and other content of local interest. After the licence approval, the new station began to construct its facilities in Stony Plain, and hire staff.

The station officially launched on June 4, 2015.

References

External links

History of CKSS-FM - Canadian Communications Foundation

Kss
Kss
Radio stations established in 2015
2015 establishments in Alberta